Our Allerød (Danish: Vores Allerød), previously New Allerød (Danish: Det Nye Allerød) was a local political party set in Allerød Municipality.

History
The party, as New Allerød, first ran for municipal councils in 2009, where 8.6% of the votes in Allerød Municipality. This ensured them two seats in the municipal council. In the regional elections, in Capital Region of Denmark, New Allerød gained 0.1% of the votes. In the 2013 local elections, New Allerød gained 9.1% of the votes in Allerød Municipality, giving them two seats in the municipal council. They received 0.2% of the votes in the regional election, which was not enough for any seats in the regional council.

In 2016 the party merged with The New Right, but some members of the old party continued the local party as Our Allerød. Viggo Janum became the front figure of the party. In the 2017 elections the party received 809 votes, equal to 5.4% of the votes in the municipality. This gave them a seat in the municipal council. In 2021 the party was dissolved, after being unable to find a new candidate to run in place of Viggo Janum.

Election results

Municipal elections

Regional elections

References

Local political parties in Denmark
2009 establishments in Denmark
2021 disestablishments in Denmark
Political parties established in 2009
Political parties disestablished in 2021
Defunct political parties in Denmark